Otokar Hořínek (12 May 1929 – 8 June 2015) was a Czech sport shooter. He was born in Prostějov. Competing for Czechoslovakia, he won a silver medal in 50 metre rifle three positions at the 1956 Summer Olympics in Melbourne.

References

1929 births
2015 deaths
Sportspeople from Prostějov
Czech male sport shooters
Olympic shooters of Czechoslovakia
Olympic silver medalists for Czechoslovakia
Shooters at the 1956 Summer Olympics
Shooters at the 1960 Summer Olympics
Medalists at the 1956 Summer Olympics
Olympic medalists in shooting